The Madonna with Child, St. John and a Child Saint is an oil on wood painting by the Italian Renaissance artist Raphael, who executed it around 1504–1505. It is also known as Madonna Terranuova as it belonged to the Italian Dukes of Terranuova, from whom it went to Berlin's Staatliche Museen, where it has been since 1854.

See also
List of paintings by Raphael

Notes

References
 PDF in Wikimedia

External links
 

1500s paintings
Paintings of the Madonna and Child by Raphael
Paintings in the Gemäldegalerie, Berlin
Nude art